Katerina Belkina ( born 1974, Samara, Russia) is a Russian contemporary pictoralist photographer and painter. She digitally manipulates many of her photographs to appear as paintings, and often uses herself as the model in her work.

Life 
Belkina grew up in an artistic family. Her mother was also an artist. From 1989 Belkina studied at the Art School and the Petrow-Vodkin art academy in Samara. From 1994 to 1999 she worked at the publishing house Fedorow in Samara. In 2000 she started to study at the Michael-Musorin school for photography in her hometown where she studied till 2002. At the same time she worked as a computer graphic designer at a Russian television channel.

In 2007, Belkina was nominated for the Russian Kandinsky Prize. In 2009/2010 she was at the 1st Photo Biennale of the Russian Museum at the Marble Palace in St. Petersburg. In 2011, she was in the framework of the Fourth Moscow Biennale of Contemporary Art, an exhibition curated by Tatiana Kurtanova. In 2015, she was awarded the International Lucas-Cranach-Preis. In 2016, she won the Hasselblad Masters’ Competition with a self-portrait as a pregnant woman.

Belkina is a member of the Union of Russian Photographers.

Work 

Belkina's photographic work is strongly influenced by the painting. It focuses entirely on portraits. In recent years she mainly focused on staged self-portraits. The series "Paint" combined picturesque and photographic elements and reinterpreted paintings by famous painters. The series "Hieroglyph" consists of body fragments, processed for a collage. The series "Empty Spaces" was created in 2010/11. Here she staged herself in a chilly style in front of urban skylines. Her artworks were published, for example, in Photo Art, Twill, Kunstbeeld.NL, Eyemazing, the Monthly Art Magazine, Fine Art Photo, Zebra, National Geographic and in the Russian Gala, Photo Biennale of the Russian Museum.

Awards 
 2007: Kandinsky Prize, Moscow (nomination for "Project of the Year")
 2012: IPA International Photography Awards, Los Angeles (1st place in the categories "Fine Art, Collage", "Fine Art, Portrait", "People, Self-Portrait" and "Special, Digitally Enhanced")
 2015: International Lucas-Cranach-Preis of the Cranach-Foundation (1st place)
 2016: Hasselblad Masters Award (1st place in the category "Art")

Selected exhibitions

Solo

 2014: Empty Spaces, Duncan Miller Gallery, Santa Monica, US
 2015: The Sinner, Being 3 Gallery, Beijing, China
2015: Revival, Galerie Lilja Zakirova, Heusden, Netherlands
 2016: Humanism, CreArte Studio, Oderzo, Italy
 2016" Paint, Faur Zsófi Gallery, Budapest, Hungary
 2017: Repast, Till Richter Museum, Buggenhagen, Germany
 2017: Katerina Belkina, Direktorenhaus – Museum for Art Crafts Design, Berlin, Germany
 2018: Katerina Belkina, GalerieKanzlei im Kunstareal, Munich, Germany

Group
 2009: 1st Photo Biennale of the Russian Museum, Marble Palace, Saint Petersburg, Russia
 2010: Russian Tales, EXPRMNTL Gallery, Toulouse, France
 2012: Madre Russia, Museo Civico, Asolo, Italy
 2015: Humble me, aeroplastics contemporary, Brussels, Belgium
 2015: Cranach und die Moderne, Stiftung Christliche Kunst Wittenberg, Lutherstadt Wittenberg, Germany
 2015: Cranach 2.0, Cranach-Stiftung Wittenberg, Lutherstadt Wittenberg, Germany
 2016: Beyond the boundaries, Faur Zsófi Gallery, Budapest, Hungary
 2016: PhotograpHER – women taking photos of women, Spazio Contemporanea, Brescia, Italy
 2016: error: x, OSTRALE Centre for Contemporary Art, Dresden, Germany
 2016: Until It Turns Slightly Pink..., C.A.M Gallery, Istanbul, Turkey
 2017: CRANACH. Meister – Marke – Moderne, Museum Kunstpalast Düsseldorf, Germany
 2017: HUMAN/DIGITAL: a symbiotic love affair, Kunsthal Rotterdam, Netherlands
 2017: Nature Morte. Contemporary Artists Revive the Still Life, National Museum, Wrocław, Poland
 2017: Denn durch die Liebe wird der Mensch besser, Stiftung Christliche Kunst Wittenberg, Germany
 2017: so weit – so gut, Kunsthalle Erfurt, Germany

Publications 
 My Work Is My Personal Theatre. Shift Books, Berlin 2020,

References

External links

Official website
 "Empty Spaces" by Katerina Belkina; A Fascinating Self-Portrait Series, Huffington Post, 4. February 2013
 Katerina Belkina: My work is my personal theater, Interview in Bleek Magazine, 5 August 2015

1974 births
Russian women photographers
Russian women painters
Living people
21st-century Russian women artists
21st-century women photographers